The Soviet offensive plans controversy was a debate among historians in the late 20th and early 21st centuries as to whether Joseph Stalin had planned to launch an attack against Nazi Germany in the summer of 1941. The controversy started with Viktor Suvorov with his 1980s book Icebreaker: Who started the Second World War? where he argued, based on his analysis of historical documents and data, that Stalin used Nazi Germany as a proxy to attack Europe.

The thesis by Suvorov that Stalin had planned to attack Nazi Germany in 1941 was rejected by a number of historians, such as Antony Beevor, Gabriel Gorodetsky, David Glantz and Dmitri Volkogonov and was partially supported by Valeri Danilov, Joachim Hoffmann, Mikhail Meltyukhov, and Vladimir Nevezhin.

The majority of historians believe that Stalin was seeking to avoid war in 1941, as he believed that his military was not ready to fight the German forces, although there is no agreement among historians as to why Stalin persisted with his strategy of appeasement of Nazi Germany despite growing evidence of an imminent German invasion.

Background to the Soviet offensive plans controversy 

Historians have debated whether Stalin was planning an invasion of German territory in the summer of 1941. The debate began in the late 1980s when Viktor Suvorov published a journal article and later the book Icebreaker in which he claimed that Stalin had seen the outbreak of war in Western Europe as an opportunity to spread communist revolutions throughout the continent, and that the Soviet military was being deployed for an imminent attack at the time of the German invasion. This view had also been advanced by former German generals following the war. Suvorov's thesis was fully or partially accepted by a limited number of historians, including Valeri Danilov, Joachim Hoffmann, Mikhail Meltyukhov, and Vladimir Nevezhin and attracted public attention in Germany, Israel, and Russia. It has been strongly rejected by most historians and Icebreaker is generally considered to be an "anti-Soviet tract" in Western countries. David Glantz and Gabriel Gorodetsky wrote books to rebut Suvorov's arguments. The majority of historians believe that Stalin was seeking to avoid war in 1941, as he believed that his military was not ready to fight the German forces.

According to professor Alexander Hill, it is currently believed that whereas the war against "capitalist powers" was seen as potentially inevitable by Soviet leadership, the Soviet Union was making some preparations for war, and the Soviet pursuit for a collective security system in Europe ("Litvinov's line") was sincere in the late 1930s, the event that triggered active Soviet war preparations was the rapid collapse of the Anglo-French alliance in 1940.

Suvorov, Icebreaker, and the 1980s 
Vladimir Rezun, a former officer of the Soviet military intelligence and a defector to the UK, considered the claim in his 1988 book Icebreaker: Who Started the Second World War under the pseudonym Viktor Suvorov and again in several subsequent books. He argued that Soviet ground forces were well-organized and mobilized en masse along the German–Soviet frontier for a Soviet invasion of Europe slated for Sunday, 6 July 1941 but were unprepared to defend their own territory.

One of Suvorov's pieces of evidence favoring the theory of an impending Soviet attack was his claim regarding the maps and phrasebooks issued to Soviet troops. Military topographic maps, unlike other military supplies, are strictly local and cannot be used elsewhere than in the intended operational area. Suvorov claims Soviet units were issued with maps of Germany and German-occupied territory, and phrasebooks including questions about SA offices—SA offices were found only in German territory proper. In contrast, maps of Soviet territory were scarce. Notably, after the German attack, the officer responsible for maps, Lieutenant General M. K. Kudryavtsev, was not punished by Stalin, who was known for extreme punishments after failures to obey his orders. According to Suvorov, this demonstrates that Kudryavtsev was obeying the orders of Stalin, who simply did not expect a German attack.

Suvorov offers as another piece of evidence the extensive effort Stalin took to conceal general mobilization by manipulating the laws setting the conscription age. That allowed Stalin to provide the expansive build-up of the Red Army. Since there was no universal military draft in the Soviet Union until 1939, by enacting the universal military draft on 1 September 1939 (the date World War II had begun), and by changing the minimum age for joining the Red Army from 21 to 18, Stalin triggered a mechanism which achieved a dramatic increase in the military strength of the Red Army.

This specific law on mobilization allowed the Red Army to increase its army of 1,871,600 men in 1939 to 5,081,000 in the spring of 1941 under secrecy to avoid alarming the rest of the world. Eighteen million reservists were also drafted. The duration of service was 2 years. Thus, according to supporters of this theory, the Red Army had to enter a war by 1 September 1941 or the drafted soldiers would have to be released from service.

Suvorov's main points include the following:

 The Soviet Union was intrinsically unstable. It had to expand to survive. According to Suvorov's interpretation of the permanent revolution theory, the communist system had to expand and occupy the entire world to survive. Otherwise, the system would fail in a peaceful and/or military struggle with surrounding "capitalist" countries. Stalin and other Soviet leaders opposed this and high-ranking officials who supported "permanent revolution" were purged from the Communist Party of the Soviet Union. Stalin publicly declared that "the ultimate victory of socialism... can only be achieved on an international scale". Under this theory, Soviet leaders therefore started preparations for a large-scale war of aggression. They officially declared an adherence to the theory of "Socialism in One Country", according to which Socialism can win in a single country, without being immediately overthrown by hostile capitalist neighbors. This leading country would then help revolutionary movements in other countries. Either way, the Soviet pre-war doctrine was based on the Marxism–Leninist theory that capitalism will be overthrown through Communist revolution.
 The Soviet Union made extensive preparations for a future war of aggression during the 1920s and 1930s. Suvorov provides an extensive analysis of Stalin's preparations for war. According to Suvorov, there were supposed to be three Five-Year Plan phases that would prepare the Soviet Union for war. The first one was to be focused on collectivisation, the second focused on industrialisation, and the third phase would emphasize the militarisation of the country.
 Stalin escalated tensions in Europe by providing a combination of economic and military support to Weimar Germany, and later to Nazi Germany (see Germany–Soviet Union relations before 1941). After World War I, the Entente attempted to impose severe restrictions on Weimar Germany to prevent it from rearming and again becoming a significant military competitor. During "the early 1920s until 1933, the Soviet Union was engaged in secret collaboration with the German military to enable it to circumvent the provisions of the Versailles Treaty", which limited Germany's military production. Moscow allowed the Germans to produce and test their weapons on Soviet territory, while some Red Army officers attended general-staff courses in Germany. The basis for this collaboration was the Treaty of Rapallo, signed between the two nations in 1922, and subsequent diplomatic interactions. This collaboration ended when the anti-communist Nazis took power in 1933. But, according to Suvorov, in the years 1932–1933, "Stalin helped Hitler come to power by forbidding German Communists to make common cause with the Social Democrats against the Nazis in parliamentary elections". Suvorov claims that Stalin's plan and vision was that Hitler's predictability and his violent reactionary ideas made him a candidate for the role of "icebreaker" for the Communist revolution. By starting wars with European countries, Hitler would validate the USSR's entry into World War II by attacking Nazi Germany and "liberating" and Sovietising all of Europe. When concluding the Molotov–Ribbentrop Pact in 1939, Stalin "clearly counted on the repetition of the 1914–1918 war of attrition, which would leave the "capitalist" countries so exhausted that the USSR could sweep into Europe virtually unopposed" (see also Stalin's speech of 19 August 1939).
 According to Suvorov and others, Stalin always planned to exploit military conflict between the capitalist countries to his advantage. He said as early as 1925 that "Struggles, conflicts and wars among our enemies are...our great ally...and the greatest supporter of our government and our revolution" and "If a war does break out, we will not sit with folded arms – we will have to take the field, but we will be last to do so. And we shall do so in order to throw the decisive load on the scale".
 World War II was initiated by the Soviet Union and Nazi Germany, which became co-belligerents after signing the Molotov–Ribbentrop Pact. The essence of this pact was in the secret protocols which divided Europe into spheres of influence, and removed the Polish buffer between Germany and the USSR. Some countries that fell into the Soviet sphere of influence – Estonia and Latvia – were occupied. The difference between these smaller nations, occupied and annexed by the USSR, and Poland (which was initially attacked by Germany) was that Poland had military assistance guarantees from Great Britain and France.
 Stalin planned to attack Nazi Germany from the rear in July 1941, only a few weeks after the date on which the Axis invasion of the Soviet Union took place. According to Suvorov, the Red Army had already redeployed from a defensive to an offensive stance. Suvorov also states that Stalin had made no major defensive preparations.
 Hitler's intelligence identified the USSR's preparations to attack Germany. Therefore, the Wehrmacht had drafted a preemptive war plan based on Hitler's orders as early as mid-1940, soon after the Soviet annexations of Bessarabia and Northern Bukovina. On 22 June 1941, the Axis began an assault on the USSR.

Criticism and support of books by Suvorov 
In some countries, particularly in Russia, Germany, and Israel, Suvorov's thesis has jumped the bonds of academic discourse and captured the imagination of the public. According to an article in The Inquiries Journal by Christopher J. Kshyk, the debate on whether Stalin intended to launch offensive against Germany in 1941 remains inconclusive but has produced an abundance of scholarly literature and helped to expand the understanding of larger themes in Soviet and world history during the interwar period. Kshyk also notes the problems because of the still-limited access to Soviet archives and the emotional nature of debate from national pride and the participants' political and personal motivations. Kshyk believe to be erroneous the notion that Stalin was preparing to launch an offensive against Germany in the summer of 1941.

However, studies by some historians, such as the Russian military historian Mikhail Meltyukhov (Stalin's Missed Chance), gave partial support to the claim that Soviet forces were concentrating to attack Germany. Other historians who support that thesis are Vladimir Nevezhin, Boris Sokolov, Valeri Danilov and Joachim Hoffmann. Offensive interpretations of Stalin's prewar planning are also supported by the Sovietologist Robert C. Tucker and by Pavel N. Bobylev. Hoffmann argues that the actual Soviet troop concentrations, fuel depots and airfields were near the German-Soviet border in what was Poland. All of them are said to be unsuitable for defensive operations.

American historian Sean McMeekin claims that while Suvorov thesis was largely ignored in the West, based on the authority of notable critics like Glantz and Gorodetsky, it was nevertheless treated serious in the Eastern European countries, which were directly involved in German-Soviet struggle. The discussion resulted in dozens of serious studies at least partially supporting Suvorov's thesis, which were usually better documented than Suvorov's. Notable examples include collections of documents by L.E. Reshin and collaborators and studies of Meltyukhov and Mark Solonin. As of 2021 most of these have not been translated into English. According to McMeekin, the new studies show that the traditional view of surprise German attack against the Soviet Union can be no longer held. Yet despite the vast increase of knowledge due to the recent research, there are still many unknown issues, especially the real intentions of Stalin on the eve of war, which were known only to Stalin himself.

{| class="wikitable" style="margin: 1em auto;"
|+Strength of the opposing forces on theSoviet Western border. 22 June 1941

!
!Germany
!Soviet Union
!Ratio
|-
| Divisions || 128 || 174 || 1 : 1.4
|-
| Personnel || 3,459 || 3,289 || 1.1 : 1
|-
| Guns and mortars || 35,928 || 59,787 || 1 : 1.7
|-
| Tanks (incl assault guns) || 3,769 || 15,687 || 1 : 4.2
|-
| Aircraft || 3,425 || 10,743 || 1 : 3.1
|}Source: Mikhail Meltyukhov Stalin's Missed Chance table 43,45,46,47,

Supporters of the theory also refer to various facts, such as the publication of Georgy Zhukov's proposal of 15 May 1941, which called for a Soviet strike against Germany, to support their position. That document suggested a secret mobilisation and deployment of Red Army troops next to the western border under the cover of training. However, Robin Edmonds argued that the Red Army's planning staff would not have been doing its job well if it had not considered the possibility of a preemptive strike against the Wehrmacht, and Teddy J. Uldricks pointed out that no documentary evidence shows that Zhukov's proposal was ever accepted by Stalin.

Another piece of evidence is Stalin's speech of 5 May 1941 to graduating military cadets. He proclaimed: "A good defense signifies the need to attack. Attack is the best form of defense.... We must now conduct a peaceful, defensive policy with attack. Yes, defense with attack. We must now re-teach our army and commanders. Educate them in the spirit of attack". However, according to Michael Jabara Carley, that speech could be equally interpreted as a deliberate attempt to discourage the Germans from launching an invasion.

Colonel Dr. Pavel N. Bobylev was one of the military historians from the Soviet (later Russian) Ministry of Defense who in 1993 published the materials of the January 1941 games on maps. More than 60 top Soviet officers for about ten days in January rehearsed the possible scenarios to begin a war against the Axis. The materials show that no battles were played out on the Soviet soil. The action started only when the Soviets ("Easterners") attacked westward from their border and, in the second game ("South Variant"), even from positions deep inside the enemy's land.

Other Russian historians, Iu. Gor'kov, A.S. Orlov, Iu. A. Polyakov, and Dmitri Volkogonov, analyzed newly-available evidence to demonstrate that Soviet forces were certainly not ready for the attack.

Criticism 
Among the noted critics of Suvorov's work are the Israeli historian Gabriel Gorodetsky; the American military historian David Glantz; and the Russian military historians Makhmut Gareev, Lev Bezymensky, and Dmitri Volkogonov and Alexei Isayev. Many other western scholars, such as Teddy J. Uldricks, Derek Watson, Hugh Ragsdale, Roger Reese, Stephen Blank, and Robin Edmonds, and Ingmar Oldberg agree that the Suvorov's major weakness is "that the author does not reveal his sources" and rely on circumstantial evidence. The historian Cynthia A. Roberts is even more categorical and claims that Suvorov's writings have "virtually no evidentiary base".

Suvorov's most controversial thesis was that the Red Army had made extensive preparations for an offensive war in Europe but was totally unprepared for defensive operations on its own territory.

One of Suvorov's arguments was that certain types of weapons were mostly suited for offensive warfare and that the Red Army had large numbers of such weapons. For example, he pointed out that the Soviet Union was outfitting large numbers of paratroopers and actually prepared to field entire parachute armies, and he stated that paratroopers are suitable only for offensive action, which the Soviet military doctrine of the time recognised. Suvorov's critics say that the Soviet paratroopers were not well trained or armed. Similarly, Suvorov cited the development of the KT/Antonov A-40 "flying tank" as evidence of Stalin's aggressive plans, but his critics say that development of that tank was started only in December 1941.

David M. Glantz disputes the argument that the Red Army was deployed in an offensive stance in 1941 and states that the Red Army was in a state of only partial mobilization in July 1941 from which neither effective defensive or offensive actions could be offered without considerable delay.

Antony Beevor wrote that "the Red Army was simply not in a state to launch a major offensive in the summer of 1941, and in any case Hitler's decision to invade had been made considerably earlier." However, he also noted that "it cannot be excluded that Stalin... may have been considering a preventive attack in the winter of 1941 or more probably in 1942...".

Paweł Wieczorkiewicz, the author of a detailed description of the purge in the Red Army (Łańcuch śmierci: czystka w Armii Czerwonej 1937–1939, 1335 pages), believed that the Red Army had not been  prepared to fight in 1941 because of the recent purges of the Red Army and its modernisation projects.

A Soviet émigré, the historian Alexandr Nekrich, while extremely critical of Stalin in other contexts, also rejected Suvorov's ideas as unsubstantiated and contrary to Stalin's broader policy.

Roger R. Reese has said some of Suvorov's claims have been shown to simply be inaccurate, such as his claim regarding Soviet conscription started only in 1939, but conscription had existed since 1925.

David Brandenberger said that the recently-published German Intelligence analysis of Soviet military readiness before 1941 had concluded that Soviet preparations to be "defensive".

Middle positions 
In a 1987 article in the Historische Zeitschrift journal, the German historian Klaus Hildebrand argued that both Hitler and Stalin had separately planned to attack each other in 1941. He considered that the news of Red Army concentrations near the border had led to Hitler engaging in a Flucht nach vorn ("flight forward"), a response to a danger by charging on, rather than retreating: "Independently, the National Socialist program of conquest met the equally far-reaching war-aims program which Stalin had drawn up in 1940 at the latest".

Support 
The work by Suvorov gathered some support among Russian historians, starting in the 1990s. Support in Russia for Suvorov's claim that Stalin had been preparing a strike against Hitler in 1941 began to emerge as some archive materials were declassified. Authors supporting the Stalin 1941 assault thesis are Valeri Danilov, V.A. Nevezhin, Constantine Pleshakov, Mark Solonin and Boris Sokolov. Although the USSR attacked Finland, no documents have been found to date which would indicate 26 November 1939 as the assumed date for the beginning of provocations or 30 November as the date of the planned Soviet assault.

One view was expressed by Mikhail Meltyukhov in his study Stalin's Missed Chance. The author states that the idea for striking Germany arose long before May 1941, and was the very basis of Soviet military planning from 1940 to 1941. Providing additional support for this thesis is that no significant defense plans have been found. In his argument, Meltyukhov covers five different versions of the assault plan ("Considerations on the Strategical Deployment of Soviet Troops in Case of War with Germany and its Allies" (Russian original)), the first version of which was developed soon after the outbreak of World War II. The last version was to be completed by 1 May 1941. Even the deployment of troops was chosen in the South, which would have been more beneficial in case of a Soviet assault.

In Stalin's War of Extermination, Joachim Hoffmann made extensive use of interrogations of Soviet prisoners of war, ranging in rank from general to private, conducted by their German captors during the war. The book is also based on open-source, unclassified literature, and recently declassified materials. Based on this material, Hoffmann argues that the Soviet Union was making final preparations for its own attack when the Wehrmacht struck. Danilov and Heinz Magenheimer examined this plan and other documents in the early 1990s, which might indicate Soviet preparations for an attack. Both researchers came to the conclusion that Zhukov's plan of May 15, 1941 reflected Stalin's alleged speech of 19 August 1939 heralding the birth of the new offensive Red Army.

Mark Solonin notes that several variants of a war plan against Germany had existed at least since August 1940. He argues that in the Russian archives there are five versions of the general plan for the strategic deployment of the Red Army and ten documents reflecting the development of plans for operational deployment of western military districts. The differences between them were slight, all documents (including operational maps signed by the Deputy Chief of General Staff of the Red Army) are the plans for the invasion with depth offensive 300 km. Solonin also states that no other plans for Red Army deployment in 1941 have been found so far, and that the concentration of Red Army units in Western parts of USSR was done in direct accordance with the May "Considerations on plan for strategic deployment":

Planned and actual Red Army deployment on the Soviet Western Border

Notes: first figure– total number of divisions; second figure– tank divisions; third figure – motorized divisions

According to the Plan of Cover, after the commencement of combat actions, two divisions of the Northwest front, expanded in Estonia, were transferred to the Northern Front.

Several politicians have also made claims similar to Suvorov's. On 20 August 2004, the historian and former Estonian prime minister Mart Laar published an article in The Wall Street Journal, When Will Russia Say 'Sorry'?: "The new evidence shows that by encouraging Hitler to start World War II, Stalin hoped to simultaneously ignite a world-wide revolution and conquer all of Europe". Another former statesman to share those views of a purported Soviet aggressive plan is the former Finnish President Mauno Koivisto: "It seems to be clear the Soviet Union was not ready for defense in the summer of 1941, but it was rather preparing for an assault.... The forces mobilized in the Soviet Union were not positioned for defensive, but for offensive aims". He concluded, "Hitler's invasion forces didn't outnumber [the Soviets], but were rather outnumbered themselves. The Soviets were unable to organize defenses. The troops were provided with maps that covered territories outside the Soviet Union".

References

Bibliography
 Beevor, Antony (2012). The Second World War. Back Bay Books. 
 Bellamy, Christopher (2007). Absolute War: Soviet Russia in World War Two. Knopf Publishers. 
 Bergstrom, Christer (2007). Barbarossa - The Air Battle: July–December 1941. London: Chevron/Ian Allan. .
 Bethell, Nicholas and Time - Life Books Attack of USSR (Hard cover)
 Förster, Jürgen; Mawdsley, Evan. "Hitler and Stalin in Perspective: Secret Speeches on the Eve of Barbarossa", War in History, Vol. 11, Issue 1. (2004), pp. 61–103.
 Farrell, Brian P. "Yes, Prime Minister: Barbarossa, Whipcord, and the Basis of British Grand Strategy, Autumn 1941", The Journal of Military History, Vol. 57, No. 4. (1993), pp. 599–625.
 Glantz, David M., Col (rtd.) Soviet Military Operational Art: In Pursuit of Deep Battle. Frank Cass, London. 1991. 
 Glantz, David M. Barbarossa: Hitler's invasion of Russia, 1941. Stroud, Gloucestershire: Tempus, 2001 (paperback).
 Glantz, David M. Stumbling Colossus: The Red Army on the Eve of World War. Lawrence, KA: University Press of Kansas, 1998 (hardcover).
 Glantz, David M. Colossus Reborn: the Red Army at War, 1941–1943. Kansas: University Press of Kansas, 2005 (hardcover).
 Gorodetsky, Gabriel Grand Delusion: Stalin and the German Invasion of Russia. New Haven, CT; London: Yale University Press, 2001 (paperback).
 Kershaw, Robert J. War Without Garlands: Operation Barbarossa, 1941/42. Shepperton: Ian Allan, 2000 (hardcover).
 Krivosheev, G.F. ed. Soviet casualties and combat losses in the twentieth century. London: Greenhill Books, 1997 (hardcover). Available on-line in Russian.
 Koch, H.W. "Hitler's 'Programme' and the Genesis of Operation 'Barbarossa'", The Historical Journal, Vol. 26, No. 4. (1983), pp. 891–920.
 Latimer, Jon, Deception in War, London: John Murray, 2001
 Maser, Werner. Der Wortbruch: Hitler, Stalin und der Zweite Weltkrieg. München: Olzog, 1994 (hardcover); München: Heyne, 2001 (paperback).
 Megargee, Geoffrey P. War of Annihilation: Combat and Genocide on the Eastern Front, 1941. Lanham, MA: Rowman & Littelefield, 2006 (hardcover, ; paperback).
 Mineau, André. Operation Barbarossa: ideology and ethics against human dignity. Amsterdam/New York: Rodopi, 2004.
 Murphy, David E. What Stalin Knew: The Enigma of Barbarossa. New Haven, CT; London: Yale University Press, 2005 (hardcover); 2006 (paperback).
 Reviewed by Robert Conquest at The American Historical Review, Vol. 111, No. 2. (2006), p. 591.
 Nekrich, Aleksandr Moiseevich. "June 22, 1941; Soviet Historians and the German Invasion". Columbia: University of South Carolina Press, 1968.
 Pleshakov, Constantine. Stalin's Folly: The Tragic First Ten Days of World War Two on the Eastern Front. Boston: Houghton Mifflin, 2005 (hardcover).
 Rayfield, Donald. Stalin and his Hangmen, London, Penguin Books, 2004, 
 Reviewed by David R. Snyder in The Journal of Military History, Vol. 69, No. 1. (2005), pp. 265–266.
 Roberts, Cynthia. "Planning for War: The Red Army and the Catastrophe of 1941". Taylor and Francis Publishers. Europe-Asia Studies, Vol. 47, No. 8 (December 1995), pp. 1293–1326.
 Rees, Laurence. War of the Century: When Hitler Fought Stalin. New York: New Press, 1999 (hardcover).
 Shirer, William L. The Rise and Fall of the Third Reich.  Simon and Schuster, 1960 (1964 Pan Books Ltd. reprint).
 Spiegel, 31/1962 KRIEGSAUSBRUCH 1941 Von Stalin provoziert? (electronic version).
 Suvorov, Viktor. The Chief Culprit: Stalin's Grand Design to Start World War II. Dulles, VA: Potomac Books, 2007 (hardcover).
 Taylor, A.J.P. and Mayer, S.L., eds. A History of World War Two. London: Octopus Books, 1974. .
 Waller, John. The Unseen War in Europe: Espionage and Conspiracy in the Second World War. Tauris & Co., 1996. 
 Weeks, Albert L. Stalin's Other War: Soviet Grand Strategy, 1939–1941. Lanham, MD: Rowman & Littlefield, 2002 (hardcover); 2003 (paperback).
 Wegner, Bernd ed. From Peace to War: Germany, Soviet Russia, and the World, 1939–1941 Providence, RI: Berghahn Books, 1997 (hardcover).
 Reviewed by Peter Konecny, Canadian Journal of History, Vol. 34 Issue 2. (August 1999) pp. 288–290.
 Wieczynski, Joseph L.; Fox, J.P. "Operation Barbarossa: The German Attack on The Soviet Union, June 22, 1941", The Slavonic and East European Review, Vol. 74, No. 2. (1996), pp. 344–346.
 Ziemke, Earl F. Moscow to Stalingrad: Decision in the East. Washington DC: U.S. Army Center of Military History, 1987; New York: Military Heritage Press, 1988 (hardcover).

Germany–Soviet Union relations
Military history of the Soviet Union during World War II
Operation Barbarossa
Pseudohistory